Newport '58 is a first live album by vocalist Dinah Washington. It was recorded on July 6, 1958 at the Newport Jazz Festival, Newport, Rhode Island, and arranged by Melba Liston.

Track listing
"Lover, Come Back to Me" (Sigmund Romberg, Oscar Hammerstein II) - 2:16
"Backwater Blues" (Bessie Smith) - 4:33
"Crazy Love" (Sammy Cahn, Phil Tuminello) - 3:27
"All of Me" (Gerald Marks, Seymour Simons) - 5:18
"Backstage Blues" (Instrumental) (Don Elliott, Terry Gibbs, Urbie Green) - 9:10
"Julie and Jake" (Instrumental) (Gibbs) - 8:40

Outtakes 
2 previously unreleased tracks included in The Complete Dinah Washington on Mercury, Vol. 5 (1956 - 1958) CD (1991).
"Send Me to the 'Lectric Chair" (George Brooks, Fletcher Henderson) - 3:53
"Me and My Gin" (Harry Burke) - 3:26

Personnel

 Dinah Washington - vocals, vibraphone
 Blue Mitchell - trumpet
 Melba Liston - trombone, arranger
 Urbie Green - trombone
 Sahib Shihab - baritone saxophone
 Harold Ousley - tenor saxophone
 Terry Gibbs - vibraphone
 Don Elliott - vibraphone, mellophone
 Wynton Kelly - piano
 Paul West - bass
 Max Roach - drums
 Jack Tracy - producer

See also
"Jazz on a Summer's Day" - the film also features "All of Me" performed by Washington.

References

Dinah Washington live albums
1958 live albums
Albums recorded at the Newport Jazz Festival
EmArcy Records live albums
1958 in Rhode Island